CMA CGM Antoine de Saint Exupery is a container ship that is operated by French shipping company CMA CGM.  As the lead ship of her class, she is the flagship of CMA CGM's fleet.

Named after the French author and aviator, CMA CGM Antoine de Saint Exupery was ordered in April the 1st 2015 as the first of three sister ships from Hanjin Heavy Industries and Construction Philippines.  It was launched in August 2017, and after fitting out underwent sea trials in late December 2017 and early January 2018.  She was delivered to CMA CGM on 25 January 2018, ahead of her entry into service on 6 February on a routing from southeast Asia to northern Europe.

She is powered by a Winterthur Gas & Diesel model X92 low speed diesel engine, with a power output up to  that can propel her at up to 22 knots (25 mph or 40 km/h). She has a capacity of 20,954 TEUs.

References

Antoine de Saint Exupery
2017 ships
Ships built in the Philippines